MuSK (for Muscle-Specific Kinase) is a receptor tyrosine kinase required for the formation and maintenance of the neuromuscular junction. It is activated by a nerve-derived proteoglycan called agrin, which is similarly also required for neuromuscular junction formation.

MuSK signaling

Upon activation by its ligand agrin, MuSK signals via the proteins called casein kinase 2 (CK2), Dok-7 and rapsyn, to induce "clustering" of acetylcholine receptors (AChR). Both CK2 and Dok-7 are required for MuSK-induced formation of the neuromuscular junction, since mice lacking Dok-7 failed to form AChR clusters or neuromuscular synapses, and since downregulation of CK2 also impedes recruitment of AChR to the primary MuSK scaffold. In addition to the proteins mentioned, other proteins are then gathered, to form the endplate to the neuromuscular junction. The nerve terminates onto the endplate, forming the neuromuscular junction - a structure required to transmit nerve impulses to the muscle, and thus initiating muscle contraction.

Role in disease

Antibodies directed against this protein (Anti-MuSK autoantibodies) are found in some people with myasthenia gravis not demonstrating antibodies to the acetylcholine receptor. The disease still causes loss of acetylcholine receptor activity, but the symptoms affected people experience may differ from those of people with other causes of myasthenia gravis.

References 

Tyrosine kinase receptors
Developmental neuroscience
Proteins